Etadunna Airstrip (IATA:ETD, ICAO:YEDA) is a locally owned, public airstrip in South Australia.

Facilities 
There are two runways active at the airstrip:

 Runway 1 is the main runway with a length of 1190 m (3904 ft) with an approximate heading of 17/35.
 Runway 2 is the secondary runway which has a length of 1160 m (3805 ft) with an approximate heading of 09/27.

See also
List of airports in South Australia

References 

Airports in South Australia
Far North (South Australia)